is a Japanese game designer and artist, his most notable titles being Katamari Damacy and its sequel, We Love Katamari. The original Katamari game was a surprise hit and was praised for its quirkiness, originality, and charm. Takahashi is married to pianist and composer Asuka Sakai, who has worked with Takahashi on various projects.

Career

In an interview, Takahashi announced that he hopes to eventually move on from video games, with an ambition of designing a playground for children. On October 28, 2009, the Nottingham City Council announced during the Gamecity festival that Takahashi was spending a month in the city working on designs for the play area at Woodthorpe Grange. In 2012, Takahashi revealed to an audience that the Nottingham project had been indefinitely postponed, due to budget concerns. He and his wife, Asuka Sakai, formed the company uvula in October 2010 to support his freelance game design career, as well as his playground designs.

In July 2011, it was announced that he was joining Tiny Speck's Vancouver team, working on Glitch. After the game shuttered in December 2012, he moved to San Francisco.

In early 2019, the Telfair Museum ran an exhibition at the Jepson Center entitled "Keita Takahashi: Zooming Out", featuring various elements of Takahashi's work. Takahashi worked on designing the exhibits, which included a playable version of the game A͈L͈P͈H͈A͈B͈E͈T͈ with a custom controller.

In July 2022, Takahashi announced a new game project.

Works

References

External links

uvula's official website
Interview with Keita Takahashi on Gamasutra.com
Interview with Keita Takahashi on 1up.com
 

1975 births
Living people
Katamari
Japanese expatriates in Canada
Japanese expatriates in the United States
Japanese video game designers
Namco